The Pi Kappa Phi fraternity has founded a total of 232 chapters in 41 U.S. states and the District of Columbia. As of May 3, 2013, there are 178 active chapters (162 chartered, plus 16 associate chapters, or colonies), and 93 alumni organizations.

Soon after its inception at The College of Charleston in 1904 (the Alpha chapter), the fraternity began spreading to other campuses, granting charters to student groups at Presbyterian College (Beta, 1907), Berkeley (Gamma, 1909), and Furman University (Delta, 1909).  Gamma (Berkeley) was the first long-distance chapter, which helped to firmly establish Pi Kappa Phi as a national fraternity.

In some instances during those early days, the creation of a chapter was by necessity a clandestine affair, as was the case with the Delta Chapter at Furman University. At the time, South Carolina had a state law that banned fraternities at state-supported schools, so as a result, Presbyterian College and the College of Charleston were the only two South Carolina schools in which fraternities were allowed. The Furman chapter therefore operated sub rosa (under the rose), until state laws were later changed so as to allow fraternal organizations.

The next two decades saw the addition of 36 new chapters in the Midwest, South, and West Coast regions.  By 1930, Pi Kappa Phi had established a national presence, however the growth of the fraternity was slowed during the 1930s and 1940s by the Great Depression and World War II.  During the 1950s and 1960s, the fraternity began to grow more rapidly, establishing chapters across the South, strengthening its position as a southern fraternity.  The fraternity experienced unprecedented growth from 1970 to 1999, founding over 100 new chapters and establishing a more prevalent West Coast presence while further strengthening its position in the South.

As part of The Second Century Vision campaign, the national fraternity's efforts are focused on increasing the number of active chapters.  This expansion process consists of two main components: the acquisition of new chapters on previously unchartered campuses and the rechartering of inactive chapters.  As of May 3, 2013, 10 of the 16 colonies are on campuses that have once hosted active collegiate chapters, and 6 are expansion chapters.  To manage this task, the fraternity has an appointed Director of Expansion who oversees the expansion process on a national level.

Chapters

Collegiate chapters 

The chapters of Pi Kappa Phi are as follows.

Associate chapters 
The Pi Kappa Phi Fraternity continues to expand as part of its "Second Century Vision" campaign.  One of the main goals of this campaign is to increase the number of active chapters to at least 175 by the year 2014.  These expansion efforts are focused on recolonizing inactive chapters and starting new colonies at previously unchartered campuses.

Re-chartering chapters 
Re-chartering associate chapters are new chapters that are "recolonizing" at schools in which a chapter of Pi Kappa Phi previously existed which had since gone inactive.  Activation of one of these chapters means the return of the Charter to campus – thereby increasing the count of active chapters, but not the count of total chapters. Although such chapters already appear in the table above, the consolidated list of re-chartering associate chapters is repeated here for clarity. They are:

Expansion chapters 
New chapters that are formed at schools in which there had never been a previous chapter of Pi Kappa Phi are termed expansion chapters.  As the name implies, they represent growth into "new territory".  Accordingly, activation of one of these chapters increases the count of both active chapters and total chapters.

Notes

References

External links
Official Pi Kappa Phi Website

Lists of chapters of United States student societies by society
Pi Kappa Phi